The following is a list of notable events and releases of the year 2015 in Icelandic music.

Events

January

February

March
 3 – At Söngvakeppnin 2018, Ari Ólafsson is selected to represent Iceland in the 2018 Eurovision Song Contest, with the song "Heim".

April

May

June 
 23 – The Við Djúpið summer courses and music festival started in Ísafjörður, Westfjords (June 23 – 28).

July
 1 - The 16th Folk music festival of Siglufjordur was opened (July 1 - 5).

August
 12 – Reykjavik Jazz Festival opened, celebrating its 25th anniversary.

Album and Singles releases

January

February

March

April

May

June

July

August

September

October

November

See also 
 2015 in Iceland
 Music of Iceland
 Iceland in the Eurovision Song Contest 2015

References

Icelandic music
Iceland
2015 in Iceland